Ormakalundayirikkanam is a 1995 Malayalam political drama film directed by T. V. Chandran. Starring Mammootty, Master Nithin, Bharath Gopi, Priyambada Ray, Nedumudi Venu, Kukku Parameswaran and Sreenivasan, the film portrays the rise of the Communists to power in 1957 and the infamous Vimochana Samaram (Liberation Struggle) of 1959.

Film critic Kozhikodan included the film on his list of the 10 best Malayalam movies of all time.

Plot
The film is set against the backdrop of the first communist Ministry of Kerala on the eve of its dismissal in 1959 after less than two years in power. A school going teenage, Jayan, grows warm relation with Bhasi, the tailor, who is a staunch Communist Party activist. Jayan's father is a strong sympathiser of Congress party.

Jayan with knowledge dawning upon him realises how Bhasi and his near and dear ones live on the verge of fear of being annihilated by the henchmen of Congress and upper castes who seem to usurp power by unsure means and violence. Jayan's intimate rapport with Dr. Tharakan, a scientist of sorts, engaged in the theory of impending doomsday, helps him see things clearly. Jayan realises the truth besmeared by blood, murder and revenge.

Cast
 Mammootty as Tailor Bhaskaran (Bhasi) 
 Master Nithin as Jayan 
 Bharath Gopi as Tharakan   * Priyanka as Bhasakarans Wife
 Nedumudi Venu as Nambiar, Jayan's father
 Mamukkoya as Police constable
 Kukku Parameswaran
 Sreenivasan as Barber Naanu
 M. G. Soman as Chattampi Velayudhan
 Bindu Panicker
 V. K. Sreeraman as Tea Shoper
 Sreejaya

Awards
 National Film Award for Best Feature Film in Malayalam - T. V. Chandran and Salam Karassery
 Kerala State Film Award for Best Child Artist - Master Nithin
 Kerala State Film Award (Special Jury Award) - T. V. Chandran

References

External links
 

1990s Malayalam-language films
1995 drama films
1995 films
Films directed by T. V. Chandran
Best Malayalam Feature Film National Film Award winners
Indian political drama films